Yamata is a 1919 Hungarian silent drama film directed by Alexander Korda and starring Emil Fenyvessy, Ila Lóth and Gábor Rajnay. The film was made for the state-owned Hungarian film industry during the Hungarian Soviet Republic, and concerns a black slave's revolt against his master. The film's apparent political leftism, along with that of Ave Caesar! (1919), led to Korda's arrest once the Soviet Republic collapsed and he fled Hungary in 1919 during the White Terror.

Cast
Emil Fenyvessy as Márki 
Ila Lóth as Ninette, the caretaker girl
Gábor Rajnay as Yamata, the servant
Gusztáv Vándory as Baron, Ninette's love

References

External links

Hungarian silent films
Hungarian drama films
Films directed by Alexander Korda
Films of the Hungarian Soviet Republic
Soviet black-and-white films
Hungarian black-and-white films
1919 drama films
Silent drama films
Soviet silent films